Liu Sifeng (born 15 July 1955) is a Chinese systems engineer.  He is the director of the Institute for Grey Systems Studies at Nanjing University of Aeronautics and Astronautics, Nanjing, China.  He is best known for his work on grey system theory.

Education and career
Liu obtained his BE in Mathematics from Henan University in 1981, then his MS in Economics (1986) and PhD in Systems Engineering (1998) from Huazhong University of Science and Technology, Wuhan, China.  He was the doctoral student of Julong Deng, the founder of grey system theory.

Liu was appointed as a lecturer at Henan University in 1985.  He was promoted through the ranks, reaching full professor in 1994.  In 2000, he moved as a distinguished professor  to Nanjing University of Aeronautics and Astronautics, where he also serves as director of the Institute for Grey Systems Studies.  In 2014, he worked as a research professor  at De Montfort University in Leicester, UK.

Liu is the editor-in-chief of Grey Systems: Theory and Application, and of the Journal of Grey System.

Awards and honors
Liu is an honorary fellow of the World Organisation of Systems and Cybernetics, and an honorary editor of "International Journal of Grey Systems" (USA).  German Chancellor Angela Merkel mentioned Liu's contributions to grey system theory in a 2019 speech at Huazhong University of Science and Technology.

Books

References

External links

1955 births
Living people
Chinese mathematicians
Academic staff of Nanjing University of Aeronautics and Astronautics
Huazhong University of Science and Technology alumni
Henan University alumni